A  (treatise on jyotisha) is a text from a classical body of literature on the topic of Hindu astrology, known as , dating to the medieval period of Classical Sanskrit literature (roughly the 3rd to 9th centuries CE). Only the most important ones exist in scholarly editions or translations, while many remain unedited in Sanskrit or vernacular manuscripts.

Such classical texts should be distinguished from modern works. There are a great number of contemporary publications, reflecting the persisting importance of astrology in Hindu culture, and the corresponding economical attractivity of the market in India. Notable modern authors include Sri Yukteswar Giri (1855–1936) and Bangalore Venkata Raman (1912–1998).

Classification 

David Pingree classifies as jyotihshastra manuscripts on astronomy, mathematics, astrology and divination, and estimates that about 10% of surviving Sanskrit manuscripts belong to the category.

Traditionally, jyotihshastra texts are classified into three broad categories:

 samhitā or śākhā (natural astrology and omens): effects of planetary positions and other natural phenomenon on the world
 horā or jātaka (horoscopic astrology): effects of planetary positions on humans,
 gaṇita (mathematical astronomy): calculations of planetary paths and other astronomical matters such as spherics
 siddhanta: a fundamental treatise; generally uses the beginning of creation of kalpa (aeon) as the epoch of calculation
 tantra: generally uses the beginning of the kali yuga as the epoch of calculation
 karana: a handy, practical work describing short and simplified calculations; meant for panchanga-makers; generally uses the year of composition as the epoch

According to Pingree, this classification, mentioned in sources such as the Brihat Samhita (1.9),  does not cover the field adequately.

List of classical texts 

 Gargiya-jyotisha
 Garga-samhita, attributed to Vrddha Garga
 Garga Hora
 Brihat Parasara Horashastra, attributed to sage Parasara
 Jaimini Sutra, attributed to sage Jaimini
 Sphujidhwaja Hora or Yavanajataka by King Sphujidhwaja)
 Sārāvalī by Kalyanavarma
 Brihat Samhitā by Varahamihira
 Brihat Jataka by Varahamihira
 Daivajna Vallabha by Varahamihira
 Phaladeepika by Mantreshvara
 Hora Sara by Prithuyasas
 Sarvartha Chintamani by Venkatesha Daivajna
 Hora Ratna by Acharya Balabhadra
 Jataka Parijata by Vaidyanatha Deekshita
 Chamatkara Chintamani by Melpathur Narayana Bhattathiri
 Uttara Kalamritam by Ganaka Kalidasa
 Tajika Neelakanthi by Nilakantha)
 Prasna Marga by Panakkattu Nambootiri
 Dasadhyayi by Govinda Bhattathiri

See also
 Indian astronomy
 Vedanga
 Lal Kitab

References

Bibliography 

 
 
 

Hindu astrological texts
Jyotisha
Jyotisha
Sanskrit texts